The Love of a Good Woman is a collection of short stories by Canadian writer Alice Munro, published by McClelland and Stewart in 1998.

The eight stories of this collection (one of which was originally published in Saturday Night; five others were originally published in The New Yorker) deal with Munro's typical themes: secrets, love, betrayal, and the stuff of ordinary lives.

The book was awarded the 1998 Giller Prize, and was one of the selected books in the 2004 edition of Canada Reads, where it was championed by soprano Measha Brueggergosman. It also won the 1998 National Book Critics Circle Award for fiction.

Stories
 "The Love of a Good Woman"
 "Jakarta"
 "Cortes Island"
 "Save the Reaper"
 "The Children Stay"
 "Rich as Stink"
 "Before the Change"
 "My Mother's Dream"

References

External links
 The Love of a Good Woman at Penguin Canada
 The Love of a Good Woman at Random House

1998 short story collections
Short story collections by Alice Munro
Scotiabank Giller Prize-winning works
McClelland & Stewart books
National Book Critics Circle Award-winning works